25 meter pistol, formerly and unofficially still often known as sport pistol, is one of the ISSF shooting events. It was devised as a women's event in the 1960s, based upon the rules of 25 meter center-fire pistol but shot with a .22-caliber sport pistol instead of the larger-caliber guns men used. As with all ISSF pistol disciplines, all firing must be done with one hand, unsupported.

In 1984, female shooting competitions began in the Olympic Games, and so sport pistol made its way into the Olympic program. Internationally, it is still only shot by women and juniors, while men have center-fire pistols instead. However, in many countries, there are also male classes in 25 meter pistol on the national level and lower.

As 25 meter pistol is Olympic, it involves shooting a final, which the center-fire event does not. The top eight contestants reach the final, which consists of four additional rapid-fire stage series of 5 shots each. The final score is added to the qualification score.

Most shooters excelling in 25 meter pistol also compete at the same level in 10 meter air pistol, a similar precision event.

World Championships, Women

World Championships, Women Team

World Championships, total medals

Current world records

Olympic and World Champions 

25 meter pistol for women was introduced in the 1984 Summer Olympics. In its first eight instalments, one shooter has succeeded in winning two gold medals: Mariya Grozdeva from Bulgaria. The current Olympic gold medallist is Anna Korakaki from Greece.

Women

Junior Men 

ISSF shooting events
Handgun shooting sports